Barce is a genus of thread-legged bugs in the family Reduviidae. There are about six described species in Barce.

Species
These six species belong to the genus Barce:
 Barce aberrans (McAtee and Malloch, 1925) i c g
 Barce fraterna (Say, 1832) i c g b
 Barce husseyi Wygodzinsky, 1966 i c g
 Barce neglecta (McAtee and Malloch, 1925) i c g
 Barce uhleri Banks, 1909 i c g b
 Barce werneri Wygodzinsky, 1966 i c g
Data sources: i = ITIS, c = Catalogue of Life, g = GBIF, b = Bugguide.net

References

Further reading

External links

 

Reduviidae